Royal Air Force Bolt Head or more simply RAF Bolt Head is a former Royal Air Force satellite airfield  south west of Salcombe on the south Devon coast, England from 1941 to 1945. During the Second World War it was used as a satellite for RAF Exeter. There were two runways, of 3,680 ft at 45° and 4,200 ft at 120°

The Ground Control Interceptor Station (GCI) RAF Hope Cove was established on the northeast side of the field in 1941 to direct fighter operations in the English Channel. Unlike the airfield, Hope Cove remained in use into the 1990s.

Today the World War II buildings are almost all gone but a memorial to the airfield's war-time history exists in the centre of the site, two notable post-war buildings survive including a large R6 Rotor bunker (used until 1994 as a Regional Seat of Government) and a grass airstrip is still used occasionally by light aircraft. The landowners also hosted an air display there in 2009 which saw a Hurricane and Spitfire visit the airfield for the first time since the war.

RAF units and aircraft

The following units were here at some point:
 Detachment from No. 10 Group Communication Flight RAF (February - October 1943)
 No. 2704 Squadron RAF Regiment
 No. 2715 Squadron RAF Regiment
 No. 2738 Squadron RAF Regiment
 No. 2953 Squadron RAF Regiment
 No. 4179 Anti-Aircraft Flight RAF Regiment

During the Second World War, 17 personnel operating from RAF Bolt Head were killed in action or died on active service.

References

Citations

Bibliography

Howell, Christopher (2009) RAF Bolt Head (privately published, no ISBN)

External links
 RAF Bolt Head on Devon Airfields
 Bolt Head Airfield web site

Royal Air Force stations in Devon
Royal Air Force stations of World War II in the United Kingdom